The Magistrates' Court of Victoria is the lowest court in the Australian state of Victoria.

The court possesses original jurisdiction over summary offences and indictable offences heard summarily, as well as civil claims up to $100,000. It is also able to hear various pre-trial criminal procedures, including bail applications and committal hearings.

Decisions of the Magistrates' Court may be appealed to the County Court, with the Supreme Court also able to hear a limited number of appeals on questions of law.

Layout
A typical courtroom layout consists of a witness box, a public gallery, the bar table (at which the parties sit), a raised bench for seating the sitting magistrate and a clerk and sometimes a dock for housing defendants in custody. Many Victorian magistrates' courts have video link facilities for witnesses to appear via remote video conference rather than in person and is used for when witnesses cannot travel or the prisoner is unable to travel to court in person.

Cases
The Magistrates' Court of Victoria hears many different types of cases, such as:
warrant application hearings;
committal hearings and police prosecutions;
bail application hearings;
money claims and other civil disputes, not exceeding $100,000;
family law and Family violence matters;

Magistrates are appointed by the Attorney General after receiving expressions of interest from Australian lawyers and are appointed as members of the Victims of Crime Assistance Tribunal (VOCAT), which is a separate and independent statutory entity which determines claims for compensation made by victims of crime and their families.

History
Although the current court was established by the Magistrates' Court Act 1989 (Victoria), Victoria has had magistrates since 1836, when the people of Melbourne elected an arbitrator of the city to resolve minor disputes. Captain William Lonsdale, a police magistrate, was appointed in 1836 and the first case was heard at a location near the present site of Southern Cross station (formerly Spencer Street station).

In 1838, a third court, the Court of Petty Sessions was created. By 1890, all three types of courts were held at 235 locations throughout Victoria.

On 20 January 1914, the new City Court was opened at Russell Street in Melbourne and Phillip Blashki JP was the first Chairman of the City Court Bench. The then Prime Minister, Alfred Deakin, presented Blashki with an illuminated address signed by 30 of the court's solicitors when he retired, aged 70.

Police magistrates were able to sit in on Petty Court sessions, but generally two or three Justice of the Peace were required for cases to be heard. The Court of Petty Sessions, also originally attended to matters under 20 pounds, and even criminal matters, like drunkenness and minor assaults.

Recent history

On 29 May 2000, a Deed of Apology was signed for the treatment of Aboriginal peoples, which tied in with National Sorry Day actions, by the Chief Magistrate and Principal Registrar on behalf of the Magistrates' Court of Victoria. The deed was received at the Wangaratta courthouse by Wally Cooper.

In 2000, Chief Magistrate of the Court Michael Adams was forced to stand down on 31 October after claims that he harassed female members of his court. This was reported on The 7.30 Report and also in the Melbourne newspapers, resulting in the extraordinary vote.

The Chief Magistrate is currently Justice Lisa Hannan. The Chief Executive Officer is Andrew Tenni. The Principal Registrar is Simone Shields.

Courthouses

Metropolitan locations
Melbourne Magistrates' Court, Melbourne
Broadmeadows Magistrates' Court, Broadmeadows
Dandenong Magistrates' Court, Dandenong
Frankston Magistrates' Court, Frankston
Heidelberg Magistrates' Court, Heidelberg
Moorabbin Justice Centre, Highett
Neighbourhood Justice Centre, Collingwood
Ringwood Magistrates' Court, Ringwood
Sunshine Magistrates' Court, Sunshine
Werribee Magistrates' Court, Werribee

Country locations

Ararat
Bacchus Marsh
Bairnsdale
Ballarat
Benalla
Bendigo
Castlemaine
Cobram
Colac
Corryong
Dromana
Echuca
Edenhope
Geelong
Hamilton
Hopetoun
Horsham
Kerang
Korumburra
Kyneton
Latrobe Valley, Morwell
Mansfield
Maryborough
Mildura
Myrtleford
Nhill
Omeo
Orbost
Ouyen
Portland
Robinvale
Sale
Seymour
Shepparton
St Arnaud
Stawell
Swan Hill
Wangaratta
Warrnambool
Wodonga
Wonthaggi

Closed metropolitan locations
Ferntree Gully Magistrates' Court, Ferntree Gully (latitude: 37°53'17.55"S, longitude: 145°17'31.59"E; now owned by Knox Community Health Service)
Box Hill Magistrates' Court
Springvale Magistrates' Court
Prahran Magistrates' Court
Williamstown Magistrates' Court, Williamstown
Moonee Ponds Magistrates' Court, Moonee Ponds
Preston Magistrates' Court, Preston
Coburg Magistrates' Court, Coburg

Closed country locations

Kilmore Magistrates' Court
Alexandra Magistrates' Court
Yarrawonga Magistrates' Court
Beechworth Magistrates' Court
Warragul Magistrates' Court
Yarram Magistrates' Court
Lakes Entrance Magistrates' Court
Casterton Magistrates' Court
Warracknabeal Magistrates' Court
Bright Magistrates' Court
Euroa Magistrates' Court
Leongatha Magistrates' Court
Red Cliffs Magistrates' Court
Cohuna Magistrates' Court
Traralgon Magistrates' Court
Nagambie Magistrates' Court
Moe Magistrates' Court

Notes

References

External links
Magistrates' Court of Victoria web site
Neighbourhood Justice Centre web site

Victoria (Australia) courts and tribunals